Kocourek and Son Hardware is a historic commercial building at 110 East North Front Street in Hazen, Arkansas.  It is a two-story brick structure, with commercial Italianate styling typical of the early 20th century.  It has two storefronts, each with plate glass display windows and recessed entrances, on the ground floor, and four pairs of sash windows on the second, set in segmented-arch openings.  Above this are two bands of brick corbelling, with four brick panels articulated by pilasters, each panel with a wrought iron grill at the center.  It house the named hardware store from its construction until 2002, and is the city's finest example of early 20th-century commercial architecture.

The building was listed on the National Register of Historic Places in 2015.

See also
National Register of Historic Places listings in Prairie County, Arkansas

References

Commercial buildings on the National Register of Historic Places in Arkansas
Commercial buildings completed in 1925
Buildings and structures in Prairie County, Arkansas
National Register of Historic Places in Prairie County, Arkansas